Duman Akhmettillauly Narzildayev (Duman Ahmettılläūly Närzıldaev; born 6 September 1993) is a Kazakhstani footballer who plays as a midfielder for Kaisar.

Club career
Narzildayev made his professional debut for Kaisar in the Kazakhstan Premier League on 10 March 2012, coming on as a substitute in the 89th minute for Oleksandr Sytnik in the home match against Aktobe, which finished as a 0–2 loss.

International career
Narzildayev made his international debut for Kazakhstan on 14 October 2020 in the UEFA Nations League, coming on as a substitute in the 78th minute for Vladislav Vasiliev against Belarus. The away match finished as a 0–2 loss.

Career statistics

International

References

External links
 
 

1993 births
Living people
People from Kyzylorda
Kazakhstani footballers
Kazakhstan international footballers
Association football midfielders
FC Kaisar players
Kazakhstan Premier League players
Kazakhstan First Division players